Afshar or Afshari is a Turkic dialect spoken in Turkey, Iran, Syria, and parts of Afghanistan by the Afshars. Ethnologue and Glottolog list it as a dialect of the South Azerbaijani language. The Encyclopædia Iranica lists it as a separate Southern Oghuz language.

According to the third edition of the Encyclopaedia of Islam:

In many cases, vowels that are rounded in Azerbaijani are not rounded in Afshar.

See also
Afshar (tribe)
Afsharid dynasty

References

Literature 
 

Agglutinative languages
Languages of Iran
Languages of Turkey
Languages of Iraq
Languages of Syria
Turkic languages of Afghanistan
Oghuz languages
Afshar tribe
Turkic languages